The Egg Harbor Commercial Bank is a historic brick building located at 134 Philadelphia Avenue in Egg Harbor City in Atlantic County, New Jersey. Built in 1896, it was added to the National Register of Historic Places on August 28, 2007, for its significance in economics. It later served as the city hall of Egg Harbor City from 1954 to 1978. The building now is a branch of the Atlantic County Library.

See also
 National Register of Historic Places listings in Atlantic County, New Jersey

References

Egg Harbor City, New Jersey
Brick buildings and structures
Commercial buildings completed in 1896
National Register of Historic Places in Newark, New Jersey
1896 establishments in New Jersey
Buildings and structures in Atlantic County, New Jersey
National Register of Historic Places in Atlantic County, New Jersey
Bank buildings on the National Register of Historic Places in New Jersey
New Jersey Register of Historic Places